Songs for Swingin' Survivors is Mick Softley's first album, released by Columbia Records in 1965. The album was produced by Peter Eden and Geoff Stephens, who had previously discovered Donovan. The album was re-released on CD by Hux Records in 2003.

Track listing
After The Third World War Is Over
The Bells Of Rhymney
Strange Fruit
Blues For Cupid Green
All I Want Is A Chance 
The War Drags On 
Keep Movin´On
Jeannie
What Makes The Wind To Blow
I´ve Gotta Deal You Can't Turn Down
West Country Girl
Plains Of The Buffalo

Critical reception 

The album flopped.

References

External links 
Mick Softley Discography Site

Mick Softley albums
1965 debut albums
Columbia Records albums
Albums produced by Geoff Stephens
Hux Records albums